Valeri Eduardovich Orekhov (born 17 July 1999) is a Kazakhstani professional ice hockey defenceman who is currently playing for Admiral Vladivostok in the Kontinental Hockey League (KHL) while on loan from Metallurg Magnitogorsk.

Playing career
Following five seasons in the KHL with Kazakh-based, Barys Nur-Sultan, Orekhov left the club as a free agent to continue in the KHL with Russian club, Metallurg Magnitogorsk, after signing a two-year contract on 23 May 2022.

In the 2022–23 season, Orekhov made 14 appearances on the blueline with Metallurg, going scoreless, before he was loaned to fellow KHL club, Admiral Vladivostok, for the remainder of the season on 22 December 2022.

Career statistics

Regular season and playoffs

International

References

External links

1999 births
Living people
Admiral Vladivostok players
Kazakhstani ice hockey defencemen
Barys Nur-Sultan players
Metallurg Magnitogorsk players
Snezhnye Barsy players
Sportspeople from Astana